Podoprionidae is a family of crustaceans belonging to the order Amphipoda.

Genera:
 Coffsia
 Podoprion Chevreux, 1891

References

Amphipoda